Edmund Aspinall (12 April 1886 – 10 May 1975) was a British gymnast. He competed in the men's artistic individual all-around event at the 1908 Summer Olympics.

References

1886 births
1975 deaths
British male artistic gymnasts
Olympic gymnasts of Great Britain
Gymnasts at the 1908 Summer Olympics
Place of birth missing
20th-century British people